The Jat people ((),) are a traditionally agricultural community in Northern India and Pakistan. Originally pastoralists in the lower Indus river-valley of Sindh, Jats migrated north into the Punjab region in late medieval times, and subsequently into the Delhi Territory, northeastern Rajputana, and the western Gangetic Plain in the 17th and 18th centuries. Of Hindu, Muslim and Sikh faiths, they are now found mostly in the Indian states of Punjab, Haryana, Uttar Pradesh and Rajasthan and the Pakistani provinces of Sindh and Punjab.

The Jats took up arms against the Mughal Empire during the late 17th and early 18th centuries. Gokula, a Hindu Jat landlord was among the earliest rebel leaders against the Mughal rule during Aurangzeb's era. The Hindu Jat kingdom reached its zenith under Maharaja Suraj Mal (1707–1763). The community played an important role in the development of the martial Khalsa panth of Sikhism. By the 20th century, the landowning Jats became an influential group in several parts of North India, including Punjab, Western Uttar Pradesh, Rajasthan, Haryana and Delhi. Over the years, several Jats abandoned agriculture in favour of urban jobs, and used their dominant economic and political status to claim higher social status.

History 

The Jats are a paradigmatic example of community- and identity-formation in early modern Indian subcontinent. "Jat" is an elastic label applied to a wide-ranging community from simple landowning peasants  to wealthy and influential Zamindars.

By the time of Muhammad bin Qasim's conquest of Sind in the eighth century, Arab writers described agglomerations of Jats in the arid, the wet, and the mountainous regions of the conquered land of Sindh.  The Arab rulers, though professing a theologically egalitarian religion, maintained the position of Jats and the discriminatory practices against them that had been put in place in the long period of Hindu rule in Sind. Between the eleventh and the sixteenth centuries, Jat herders at the Sind migrated up along the river valleys, into the Punjab, which may have been largely uncultivated in the first millennium. Many took up tilling in regions such as western Punjab, where the sakia (water wheel) had been recently introduced. By early Mughal times, in the Punjab, the term "Jat" had become loosely synonymous with "peasant", and some Jats had come to own land and exert local influence.  The Jats had their origins in pastoralism in the Indus valley, and gradually became agriculturalist farmers. Around 1595, Jat Zamindars controlled a little over 32% of the Zamindaris in the Punjab region.

According to historians Catherine Asher and Cynthia Talbot,  Over time the Jats became primarily Muslim in the western Punjab, Sikh in the eastern Punjab, and Hindu in the areas between Delhi Territory and Agra, with the divisions by faith reflecting the geographical strengths of these religions.
During the decline of Mughal rule in the early 18th century, the Indian subcontinent's hinterland dwellers, many of whom were armed and nomadic, increasingly interacted with settled townspeople and agriculturists. Many new rulers of the 18th century came from such martial and nomadic backgrounds. The effect of this interaction on India's social organization lasted well into the colonial period. During much of this time, non-elite tillers and pastoralists, such as the Jats or Ahirs, were part of a social spectrum that blended only indistinctly into the elite landowning classes at one end, and the menial or ritually polluting classes at the other. During the heyday of Mughal rule, Jats had recognized rights. According to Barbara D. Metcalf and Thomas R. Metcalf: 

As the Mughal empire faltered, there were a series of rural rebellions in North India. Although these had sometimes been characterized as "peasant rebellions", others, such as Muzaffar Alam, have pointed out that small local landholders, or zemindars, often led these uprisings. The Sikh and Jat rebellions were led by such small local zemindars, who had close association and family connections with each other and with the peasants under them, and who were often armed.

These communities of rising peasant-warriors were not well-established Indian castes, but rather quite new, without fixed status categories, and with the ability to absorb older peasant castes, sundry warlords, and nomadic groups on the fringes of settled agriculture. The Mughal Empire, even at the zenith of its power, functioned by devolving authority and never had direct control over its rural grandees. It was these zemindars who gained most from these rebellions, increasing the land under their control.  The triumphant even attained the ranks of minor princes, such as the Jat ruler Badan Singh of the princely state of Bharatpur.

Hindu Jats

 
In 1669, the Hindu Jats, under the leadership of Gokula, rebelled against the Mughal emperor Aurangzeb in Mathura. The community came to predominate south and east of Delhi after 1710.  According to historian Christopher Bayly 

The Jats had moved into the Gangetic Plain in two large migrations, in the seventeenth and eighteenth centuries respectively. They were not a caste in the usual Hindu sense, for example, in which Bhumihars of the eastern Gangetic plain were; rather they were an umbrella group of peasant-warriors. According to Christopher Bayly: 

By the mid-eighteenth century, the ruler of the recently established Jat kingdom of Bharatpur, Raja Surajmal, felt sanguine enough about durability to build a garden palace at nearby Deeg. According to historian, Eric Stokes,

Muslim Jats

When Arabs entered Sindh and other Southern regions of current Pakistan in the seventh century, the chief tribal groupings they found were the Jats and the Med people. These Jats are often referred as Zatts in early Arab writings. The Muslim conquest chronicles further point at the important concentrations of Jats in towns and fortresses of Lower and Central Sindh. Today, Muslim Jats are found in Pakistan and India.

Sikh Jats

While followers important to Sikh tradition like Baba Buddha were among the earliest significant historical Sikh figures, and significant numbers of conversions occurred as early as the time of Guru Angad (1504–1552), the first large-scale conversions of Jats is commonly held to have begun during the time of Guru Arjan (1563–1606). While touring the countryside of eastern Punjab, he founded several important towns like Tarn Taran Sahib, Kartarpur, and Hargobindpur which functioned as social and economic hubs, and together with the community-funded completion of the Darbar Sahib to house the Guru Granth Sahib and serve as a rallying point and center for Sikh activity, established the beginnings of a self-contained Sikh community, which was especially swelled with the region's Jat peasantry. They formed the vanguard of Sikh resistance against the Mughal Empire from the 18th century onwards.

It has been postulated, though inconclusively, that the increased militarization of the Sikh panth following the martyrdom of Guru Arjan (beginning during the era of Guru Hargobind and continuing after) and its large Jat presence may have reciprocally influenced each other.

At least eight of the 12 Sikh Misls (Sikh confederacies) were led by Jat Sikhs, who would form the vast majority of Sikh chiefs.

According to censuses in gazetteers published during the colonial period in the early 20th century, further waves of Jat conversions, from Hinduism to Sikhism, continued during the preceding decades. Writing about the Jats of Punjab, the Sikh author, Khushwant Singh opined that their attitude never allowed themselves to be absorbed in the Brahminic fold :

In Punjab, the states of Patiala, Faridkot, Jind, and Nabha were ruled by the Sikh Jats.

Demographics 
According to anthropologist Sunil K. Khanna, Jat population is estimated to be around 30 million (or 3 crore) in South Asia in 2010. This estimation is based on statistics of the last caste census and the population growth of the region. The last caste census was conducted in 1931, which estimated Jats to be 8 million, mostly concentrated in India and Pakistan. Deryck O. Lodrick estimates Jat population to be over 33 million (around 12 million and over 21 million in India and Pakistan, respectively) in South Asia in 2009 while noting the unavailability of precise statistics in this regard. His estimation is based on a late 1980s population projection of Jats and the population growth of India and Pakistan. He also notes that some estimates put their total population in South Asia at approximately 43 million in 2009.

Republic of India 

In India, multiple 21st-century estimates put Jats' population share at 20–25% in Haryana state and at 20–35% in Punjab state. In Rajasthan, Delhi, and Uttar Pradesh, they constitute around 9%, 5%, and 1.2% respectively of the total population.

In the 20th century and more recently, Jats have dominated as the political class in Haryana and Punjab. Some Jat people have become notable political leaders, including the sixth Prime Minister of India, Charan Singh and the sixth Deputy Prime Minister of India, Chaudhary Devi Lal.

Consolidation of economic gains and participation in the electoral process are two visible outcomes of the post-independence situation. Through this participation they have been able to significantly influence the politics of North India. Economic differentiation, migration and mobility could be clearly noticed amongst the Jat people.

Jats are classified as Other Backward Class (OBC) in seven of India's thirty-six States and UTs, namely Rajasthan, Himachal Pradesh, Delhi, Uttarakhand, Uttar Pradesh, Madhya Pradesh and Chhattisgarh. However, only the Jats of Rajasthan – excluding those of Bharatpur district and Dholpur district – are entitled to reservation of central government jobs under the OBC reservation. In 2016, the Jats of Haryana organized massive protests demanding to be classified as OBC in order to obtain such affirmative action benefits.

Pakistan 

Many Jat Muslim people live in Pakistan and have dominant roles in public life in the Pakistani Punjab and Pakistan in general. Jat communities also exist in Pakistani-administered Kashmir, in Sindh, particularly the Indus delta and among Seraiki-speaking communities in southern Pakistani Punjab, the Kachhi region of Balochistan and the Dera Ismail Khan District of the North West Frontier Province.

In Pakistan also, Jat people have become notable political leaders, like Hina Rabbani Khar.

Culture and society

Military 

Many Jat people serve in the Indian Army, including the Jat Regiment, Sikh Regiment, Rajputana Rifles and the Grenadiers, where they have won many of the highest military awards for gallantry and bravery. Jat people also serve in the Pakistan Army especially in the Punjab Regiment.

The Jat people were designated by officials of the British Raj as a "martial race", which meant that they were one of the groups whom the British favoured for recruitment to the British Indian Army. This was a designation created by administrators that classified each ethnic group as either "martial" or "non-martial": a "martial race" was typically considered brave and well built for fighting, whilst the remainder were those whom the British believed to be unfit for battle because of their sedentary lifestyles. However, the martial races were also considered politically subservient, intellectually inferior, lacking the initiative or leadership qualities to command large military formations. The British had a policy of recruiting the martial Indians from those who has less access to education as they were easier to control. According to modern historian Jeffrey Greenhunt on military history, "The Martial Race theory had an elegant symmetry. Indians who were intelligent and educated were defined as cowards, while those defined as brave were uneducated and backward". According to Amiya Samanta, the martial race was chosen from people of mercenary spirit (a soldier who fights for any group or country that will pay him/her), as these groups lacked nationalism as a trait.  The Jats participated in both World War I and World War II, as a part of the British Indian Army. In the period subsequent to 1881, when the British reversed their prior anti-Sikh policies, it was necessary to profess Sikhism in order to be recruited to the army because the administration believed Hindus to be inferior for military purposes.

The Indian Army admitted in 2013 that the 150-strong Presidential Bodyguard comprises only people who are Hindu Jats, Jat Sikhs and Hindu Rajputs. Refuting claims of discrimination, it said that this was for "functional" reasons rather than selection based on caste or religion.

Religious beliefs 

Deryck O. Lodrick estimates religion-wise break-up of Jats as follows: 47% Hindus, 33% Muslims, and 20% Sikhs.

Jats pray to their dead ancestors, a practice which is called Jathera.

Varna status 
There are conflicting scholarly views regarding the varna status of Jats in Hinduism. Historian Satish Chandra describes the varna of Jats as "ambivalent" during the medieval era. According to anthropologist Indera Paul Singh, Brahmins demoted the varna status of Jats from Kshatriya to Sat Shudra (clean Shudra) in the Vedic period for challenging the authority of Brahmins. Historian Irfan Habib states that the Jats were a "pastoral Chandala-like tribe" in Sindh during the eighth century. Their 11th-century status of Shudra varna changed to Vaishya varna by the 17th century, with some of them aspiring to improve it further after their 17th-century rebellion against the Mughals. He cites Al-Biruni and Dabestan-e Mazaheb to support the claims of Shudra and Vashiya varna respectively.

The Rajputs refused to accept Jat claims to Kshatriya status during the later years of the British Raj and this disagreement frequently resulted in violent incidents between the two communities. The claim at that time of Kshatriya status was being made by the Arya Samaj, which was popular in the Jat community. The Arya Samaj saw it as a means to counter the colonial belief that the Jats were not of Aryan descent but of Indo-Scythian origin.

Female infanticide & status of woman in society 
During colonial period, many communities including Hindu Jats were found to be practicing female infanticide in different regions of Northern India.

In Jat society, it has been observed that differential treatment is given to woman in comparison to man, birth of a male child in a family is celebrated and is considered as auspicious over the birth of a girl child where the family affair is subdued. In villages, female members are supposed to get married at a younger age and they are expected to work in fields as subordinate to the male members. There is general bias against education for the girl child in the society though the trends to it are changing with urbanisation. Purdah system is practiced by women in Jat villages which act as hindrance to their overall emancipation. The village Jat councils which are male-dominated mostly don't allow female members to head their councils as the common opinion on it is that women are inferior, incapable and less intelligent to men.

Clan system 
The Jat people are subdivided into numerous clans, some of which overlap with other groups. Hindu and Sikh Jats practice clan exogamy.

List of clans 

 Ahlawat
 Anjana Chaudhari
 Aulakh
 Bagri
 Bajwa
 Bargoti (Uttar Pradesh)
 Beniwal
 Bhalothia (Rajasthan, Haryana)
 Bharwana
 Brar
 Buttar
 Cheema
 Chhina (Punjab)
 Chilka (Rajasthan)
 Dabas
 Dahiya
 Dara (Rajasthan)
 Dharan
 Dhaliwal
 Dhaulya (Rajasthan, Uttar Pradesh, Maharashtra, Karnataka, Kerala, Tamil Nadu)
 Dhillon
 Gill
 Goriya (Haryana, Uttar Pradesh)
 Grewal
 Jats of Azad Kashmir
 Jats of Kutch
 Jewlia (Rajasthan)
 Jhajharia (Haryana, Punjab, Rajasthan)
 Jhanjhar (Rajasthan)
 Johiya
 Kalwania (Rajasthan, Haryana)
 Kasaniya (Rajasthan)
 Katewa 
 Khakh
 Khangura
 Kharal
 Khatkar (Punjab, Haryana)
 Lashari
 Malhi
 Malik
 Marhal
 Maulaheri
 Mirdha
 Muley
 Naich
 Panwar
 Pediwal (Rajasthan)
 Poonia
 Rahal
 Rahar
 Randhawa
 Ranjha
 Rath
 Rawn (Punjab)
 Rehvar
 Sandhawalia
 Sandhila (Sindh, Punjab)
 Sandhu
 Sangwan
 Sarai (Punjab)
 Sekhon
 Sial
 Sidhu
 Sunda (Rajasthan)
 Tarar
 Teotia
 Thaheem
 Tomar
 Virk
 Warraich

In popular culture
Jats are part of Punjabi and Haryanvi culture and are often portrayed in Indian and Pakistani films and songs.
Maula Jatt
The Legend of Maula Jatt
A Flying Jatt
Jatt & Juliet
Jatt & Juliet 2
Jatt James Bond
Badla Jatti Da
Jatts In Golmaal
 Jaattan ka Chhora

Notable people

See also 

 Jat Regiment
 Jat reservation agitation
 World Jat Aryan Foundation
 List of Jat dynasties and states
 List of Jat people
 Jat Sikh
 Jāti

Footnotes

References

Further reading

External links 

 

Ethnic groups in India
Ethnic groups in Pakistan
Agricultural castes
Social groups of India
Social groups of Pakistan
Social groups of Sindh
Social groups of Punjab, India
Social groups of Haryana
Social groups of Punjab, Pakistan
Social groups of Uttar Pradesh
Social groups of Rajasthan
Hindu communities
Social groups of Gujarat